Vishal Bhatia (born 6 December 1981) is an Indian first-class cricketer who plays for Himachal Pradesh.

References

External links
 

1981 births
Living people
Indian cricketers
Himachal Pradesh cricketers
People from Hamirpur, Himachal Pradesh
Cricketers from Himachal Pradesh